Veronica Lindholm (born 1984) is a Swedish politician. She served as member of the Riksdag from 29 September 2014 to 24 September 2018, representing the constituency of Västerbotten County.

References 

Living people
1984 births
Place of birth missing (living people)
21st-century Swedish politicians
21st-century Swedish women politicians
Members of the Riksdag 2014–2018
Members of the Riksdag from the Social Democrats
Women members of the Riksdag